Ioniq (stylized as IONIQ) is an automotive marque and a division of Hyundai Motor Company with headquarters in Seoul, South Korea. The marque was established in 2020 as a sub-brand for Hyundai's electric vehicle line-up. The sub-brand is slated to aid Hyundai to achieve a targeted one million electric vehicle sales annually by 2025, with the Ioniq brand projected to contribute 560,000 of those sales.

History
Prior to its introduction as a sub-brand, the Ioniq name had been used for the 2012 Hyundai i-oniq concept, a small sporty hatchback that was equipped with a battery-electric drivetrain and a range-extending gasoline engine. Between 2016 and 2022 the name was used for the Hyundai Ioniq, a compact liftback available with a choice of eco-friendly powertrains: gasoline hybrid, plug-in hybrid, or full battery-electric; the 2016 Ioniq was intended to compete with the Toyota Prius hybrid and Nissan Leaf battery-electric vehicles.

On 10 August 2020, the South Korean manufacturer Hyundai Motor Group announced the launching of a new automotive brand called Ioniq (a portmanteau of “ion” and “unique”, styled in all-capital letters as "IONIQ") in London, reserved for electric cars. At the launch, the manufacturer revealed its plans to produce electric vehicles named 5, 6 and 7 and based on the Hyundai-Kia E-GMP common electric car platform presented at the 2019 Consumer Electronics Show in Las Vegas.

The first vehicle launched was the Ioniq 5, a crossover utility vehicle that was first sold in 2021. Hyundai is currently expanding its full-electric lineup to include the Ioniq 6, a sedan which will debut in Europe and South Korea in the second half of 2022, and the Ioniq 7, a large sport-utility vehicle which is projected to hit the market in 2024.

Models 

The Ioniq 5 compact crossover was released in February 2021 and was previewed by the Hyundai Concept 45 EV presented at the 2019 Frankfurt Motor Show.

The Ioniq 6 mid-size sedan will be produced from 2022 and is foreshadowed by the Hyundai Prophecy concept car, which was scheduled to be presented at the 2020 Geneva International Motor Show but this was canceled due to the COVID-19 pandemic.

The Ioniq 7 mid-size crossover will be produced from 2024. the concept version of the future production model, called SEVEN, made its debut at the LA Motor Show in November 2021.

Design

Under its numeric nomenclature, even numbers are reserved for sedans, while odd numbers are reserved for crossovers. As a unifying design concept, Hyundai has included "Parametric Pixel" external light designs on each vehicle; these are small square lighting elements which Hyundai characterize as "a unique jewel-like design", reminiscent of 8-bit video game graphics.

In 2022, Hyundai chief of design SangYup Lee clarified there were three "pillars" consistent across the Ioniq brand:
 Living space-focused interior
 Parametric Pixel
 Sustainability and sustainable materials

Because the lineup is designed to embrace "diverse lifestyles ... rather than a one-size-fits-all approach", Lee noted that each model will follow a different theme. The E-GMP platform enables a flat floor inside, giving designers more freedom to personalize the interior for the intended use. For example, the Ioniq 6 has a "mindful cocoon" theme.

Heritage Series
Hyundai have exhibited several models in its Heritage Series, which are one-off electromod vintage Hyundai vehicles that have been restored and converted with an electric vehicle powertrain; the head- and tail-lights of Heritage Series models share the same "Parametric Pixel" design language as the Ioniq line. Technical details of the powertrains fitted to the Heritage Series vehicles were not disclosed. The Pony Heritage was part of the "Reflections in Motion" exhibition at Hyundai Motorstudio Busan (April 8 – June 27, 2021) alongside the 45 EV and Prophecy concepts; the pixelated lights of the Pony Heritage were animated, which Hyundai called the "Pixel Roadtrip".

References

External links

Hyundai Motor Group
 
South Korean brands
Vehicle manufacturing companies established in 2020
Car brands
Battery electric vehicle manufacturers
Electric vehicle manufacturers of South Korea
2020 establishments in South Korea